The Ochre Pits are a popular tourist destination in Australia's Northern Territory, approximately 100 kilometres west of Alice Springs along the Larapinta Trail.

The pits consist of several layers of multi-coloured, layered rock that was traditionally used by Indigenous Australians in ceremonies and played an important role in the continent's economy, being traded with neighbouring clans and "countries", in every direction on the continent.

The mine belongs to the Western Arrernte people. Prior to European settlement of the area in 1880, only certain men were qualified to collect the ochre.

It was considered some of the choicest ochre – soft to touch, vivid, with a slight sheen to it. The colours range from gold to crimson.

After the ochre was mined by the Western Arrernte, it was ground and mixed with emu fat for ceremonial body adornment.

See also
 West MacDonnell National Park
 West MacDonnell Ranges

References

Australian Aboriginal culture
Geology of the Northern Territory
Tourist attractions in the Northern Territory